San Vito Lo Capo Lighthouse is an active lighthouse located in the municipality of San Vito Lo Capo on the western coast of Sicily at the end of the promontory, with the same name, between the Gulf of Macari and that of Castellammare.

Description
The lighthouse was built in 1859 under the period of the House of Bourbon who ruled the Kingdom of the Two Sicilies. Another light positioned at   emits a red flash on and off in a 4 seconds period. The lighthouse is completely automated and is operated by the Marina Militare with the identification code number 2736 E.F.

See also
 List of lighthouses in Italy
 San Vito Lo Capo

References

External links

 Servizio Fari Marina Militare

Lighthouses in Italy
Buildings and structures in the Province of Trapani
Lighthouses completed in 1859